Elmira Mikayil qizi Gafarova (born March 1, 1934 – August 1, 1993), also spelled as Elmira Qafarova was an Azerbaijani politician and diplomat.

Early life
Gafarova was born on March 1, 1934, in Baku, Azerbaijan. In 1952, she completed her secondary education and was admitted to Azerbaijan State University in 1953. In 1958, she graduated from the university with a degree in Philology and continued with her post graduate studies until 1961 when she obtained her PhD in Philology. While at university, Gafarova was the deputy of the Komsomol committee of the university. In 1958, she was admitted to Azerbaijan Communist Party. In 1962, she was appointed the chairwoman of the Organization Committee Center of Azerbaijani Komsomol and in 1966 through 1970, she served as the first secretary of the organization.

Political career
In 1970–1971, Gafarova worked as the director of Department of Culture of Central Committee of Azerbaijan Communist Party and in 1971 until 1980, she was the Secretary of the Party Committee of Baku. In 1980 she was appointed to the post of Minister of Education of Azerbaijan SSR which she held until 1983. In 1983–1987, Gafarova served as the Minister of Foreign Affairs of Azerbaijan SSR. While in foreign service, she participated in UN General Assembly sessions in October 1984 on issues of racism and discrimination. She was also elected to the Supreme Soviet of Azerbaijan. From 1987 through 1991, she was the Speaker of Supreme Soviet of Azerbaijan SSR and was elected deputy to the Supreme Soviet of the Soviet Union. In 1987–89, she also served as Deputy Prime Minister of Azerbaijan SSR. When she was the speaker of parliament, Gafarova played a significant role in restoring the historic name of Ganja on December 30, 1989, and made the Nowruz holiday celebrated throughout Azerbaijan an official public holiday on March 13, 1990. She is also credited with passing a law on restoration of independence of Azerbaijan on October 18, 1991, admission of Azerbaijan Republic to United Nations on March 2, 1992, etc.

Black January

Gafarova has been of the first leaders to convene the extraordinary session of the Azerbaijani Supreme Soviet on January 21–22 and condemn the Soviet authorities for massacre of civilians in Baku on the night of January 19–20, 1990. The session of 160 deputies issued a statement of condemnation of the massacre and appealed to Supreme Soviet of USSR, Supreme Soviets of union republics, all parliaments of the world and United Nations mentioning military aggression against civilians in disregard of Geneva and Vienna Conventions. As a result, Azerbaijani General Prosecutor's Office launched a criminal investigation on paragraphs 4 and 6 of article 94 (premeditated murder in aggravating circumstances), 149 (deliberately destroying or damaging the property), 168 (abuse of power) and 225 (abuse of authority) of the Criminal Code that was effective at that time. The ongoing investigation has not yet been closed.

Awards
Gafarova has been awarded with various orders and medals of USSR. She's been awarded with Order of the Red Banner of Labour and Order of Honor during her career.

Elmira Gafarova died on August 1, 1993, in Baku, Azerbaijan. She was buried in the Alley of Honor.

See also
Ministry of Foreign Affairs of Azerbaijan

References

1934 births
1993 deaths
20th-century Azerbaijani women politicians
20th-century diplomats
Politicians from Baku
Azerbaijan Communist Party (1920) politicians
Baku State University alumni
Chairmen of the National Assembly (Azerbaijan)
Communist Party of the Soviet Union members
Education ministers of Azerbaijan
Members of the Supreme Soviet of the Azerbaijan Soviet Socialist Republic
Ministers of Foreign Affairs of Azerbaijan
People's commissars and ministers of the Azerbaijan Soviet Socialist Republic
Women government ministers of Azerbaijan
Recipients of the Order of the Red Banner of Labour
Female foreign ministers
Azerbaijani women diplomats
Soviet women diplomats
Soviet women in politics
Burials at Alley of Honor